Thermal management can mean:
 Thermal management (electronics)
 Thermal management of high-power LEDs
 Thermal management of spacecraft
 Exhaust heat management of internal combustion engines
 Thermoregulation in biological organisms
 Thermostat, a thermal control and management device for heating and cooling systems
 Thermal management technologies, a project of the Microsystems Technology Office division of DARPA